Bhutani may refer to:

 Bhutani tribe, a tribe of the Baloch people of Pakistan
 Bhutani language, a misnomer for several languages:
Bhotia language or Sherpa language
Bhutia language or Sikkimese language
Dzongkha, the official language of Bhutan
conceivably any language of Bhutan
apparently also a certain dialect of the Balochi language
 Bhutanese people, the people of Bhutan
 Bhutani Pony, a breed of pony

People with the name 
 Mohammad Saleh, Pakistani politician
 Mohammad Aslam Bhutani (born 1960), Pakistani politician
 Rishi Bhutani (born 1980), Indian actor

See also 
 Buttani, a minor planet (see  for relevant articles)
 Bhutanese (disambiguation)

Language and nationality disambiguation pages